German submarine U-203 was a German Type VIIC submarine U-boat built for Nazi Germany's Kriegsmarine for service during World War II.

Built as yard number 632 of Friedrich Krupp Germaniawerft AG in Kiel, she was laid down on 28 March 1940, launched on 4 January 1941 and commissioned on 18 February under Kapitänleutnant Rolf Mützelburg.

She was a member of eleven wolfpacks.

She was sunk by British carrier-borne aircraft and a British warship southeast of Greenland on 25 April 1943.

Design
German Type VIIC submarines were preceded by the shorter Type VIIB submarines. U-203 had a displacement of  when at the surface and  while submerged. She had two shafts and two  propellers.

U-203 was fitted with five  torpedo tubes (four fitted at the bow and one at the stern), fourteen torpedoes, one  SK C/35 naval gun, 220 rounds, and a  C/30 anti-aircraft gun. The boat had a complement of between forty-four and sixty.

Service history

First, second and third patrols
On 24 June 1941, nineteen days into her first patrol while en route from Kiel to St. Nazaire in France, U-203 attacked and sank the GRT  British merchant ship Kinross, which was part of Convoy OB 336. Later that day, she attacked the  Norwegian ship Soløy, which was with Convoy HX 133.

Arriving at St. Nazaire on 29 June, the crew of U-203 stayed ashore for another eleven days before the boat made her second patrol. Seventeen days into it, she attacked Convoy OG 69 which was sailing to Gibraltar. On the 27th, U-203 sank the  British merchant ship Hawkinge. The British Lapland and the Swedish Norita, also OG 69 merchant ships, were sunk the following day, adding a further  and  respectively to the U-boat's record.

Six days into her third patrol she joined a wolfpack attack on Convoy HG 73 On 26 September she sank the British ships  and Lapwing and the Norwegian Varanberg, destroying another  of shipping. Avocetas sinking killed 123 people. The Convoy Commodore was aboard, but was one of the few dozen survivors.

Fourth, fifth and sixth patrols
Sixteen days into her fourth patrol, on 3 November, U-203 attacked and sank Empire Gemsbuck and Everoja, British merchant ships of Convoy SC 52.

Twenty-one days into her fifth patrol on 15 January 1942, U-203 sank a small Portuguese ship, Catalina. Two days later, the Norwegian ship Octavian would also be sunk. It was never confirmed that the Octavian was sunk by the U-203.  It was surmised, the Octavain was actually never in the area where the U-203 said it was torpedoed.  The Octavian was positively identified and found on 4 July 2018 off the coast of Maryland.   Four torpedoes were fired at the Canadian ship North Gaspe, which survived the attack. One torpedo detonated close to the ship, but none actually hit.

Damaged were the American tanker Henry F. Sinclair, Jr. and the Panamanian flagged tanker Stanvac Melbourne.

Seventh, eighth and ninth patrols
The Brazilian Pedrinhas and the British  were sunk on 26 June. Two days later the American Liberty Ship Sam Houston was torpedoed and then finished off with 43 rounds from the deck gun. The British Cape Verde was sunk on 9 July and the Panamanian tanker Stanvac Palembang on 11 July bringing the tally to five victories on this successful patrol.

The next 23-day sortie was unfruitful; however, the U-boat's commander, Rolf Mützelburg, died during this patrol on 11 September. Taking the opportunity to go swimming in the Atlantic southwest of the Azores, he dived from the conning tower and struck the deck with his head and shoulder when the U-boat lurched suddenly in the swell. Rolf Mützelburg was buried at sea on 12 September 1942 in position . He was replaced by Kptlt. Hermann Kottman, who served as captain for the remainder of U-203s career.

Her ninth patrol, beginning 15 October 1942 and terminating 6 November, yielded two further ships sunk.

Loss
U-203 undertook two more patrols, both unsuccessful. On 25 April 1943 while south of Cape Farewell, Greenland she was sunk by depth charges in position . She had been attacked by Fairey Swordfish aircraft operating from the British escort carrier  and the British destroyer . Ten men were killed, there were 38 survivors.

Wolfpacks
U-203 took part in eleven wolfpacks, namely:
 Schlagetot (20 October – 1 November 1941) 
 Raubritter (1 – 5 November 1941) 
 Seydlitz (27 December 1941 – 7 January 1942) 
 Zieten (7 – 22 January 1942) 
 Iltis (6 – 10 September 1942) 
 Streitaxt (20 – 30 October 1942) 
 Raufbold (11 – 22 December 1942) 
 Spitz (22 – 31 December 1942) 
 Lerche (10 – 16 April 1943) 
 Meise (16 – 22 April 1943) 
 Specht (23 – 25 April 1943)

Summary of raiding history

Patrol log

References

Bibliography

External links

U-boats commissioned in 1941
1941 ships
World War II submarines of Germany
Ships built in Kiel
German Type VIIC submarines
U-boats sunk in 1943
U-boats sunk by depth charges
U-boats sunk by British warships
U-boats sunk by British aircraft
Maritime incidents in April 1943